The 1930 Australian Grand Prix was a motor race held at the Phillip Island circuit in Victoria, Australia on 24 March 1930. The race, which was organised by the Light Car Club of Victoria, was the third Australian Grand Prix and the third held at Phillip Island. It was staged as a scratch race with the Class A cars starting first, followed by the Class B entries three minutes later and the Class C cars a further three minutes after that. The Grand Prix title was awarded to the entry recording the fastest time for the race. Of the 22 cars which started the race, nine completed the race distance within the 4½ hour time limit.

The race was won by Bill Thompson driving a Bugatti Type 37A.

Classes
Cars competed in classes according to cylinder capacity.
 Class A: Cars up to 850cc	
 Class B: Cars over 850cc and up to 1100cc	
 Class C: Cars over 1100cc and up to 1500cc	
 Class D: Cars over 1500cc and up to 2000cc	
	
Only one entry, the 1517cc Lea-Francis Hyper of Mick Carlton, was received for Class D.
At the discretion of the organisers it was placed in Class C.

Classification

Notes 
 Attendance: Over 7,000
 Entries: 28
 Starters: 22 
 Classified finishers: 9 
 Winner's average speed: 
 Sealed Handicap winner: Cyril Dickason (Austin 7)
Fastest lap: Bill Thompson – approx. 75 mph (new lap record) 
 Race time limit: 4½ hours

References

External links
 Motor Grand Prix - 22 Start: 9 Finish, The Advertiser, Tuesday 25 March 1930, Page 15, as archived at trove.nla.gov.au
 Thompson wins Grand Prix in Bugatti,  The Referee, Wednesday 26 March 1930, Page 17

Grand Prix
Australian Grand Prix
Motorsport at Phillip Island
Australian Grand Prix